Marcus Aemilius Lepidus was a Roman consul for the year 158 BC, together with Gaius Popillius Laenas. He was a praetor in 161 or earlier, and was possibly the presiding praetor when the Senate was holding discussions on the dispute between Magnesia and Priene. He is mentioned in a context that suggests he was one of the Decemviri sacris faciundis, a priestly college (collegium) who oversaw the Sibylline Books in 143.

References 

Roman Republican praetors
2nd-century BC Roman consuls
Aemilii Lepidi